is a Japanese footballer who plays as a defender for J2 League club Blaublitz Akita.

Playing career
Kaga was born in Futada, Tennō, Akita on 30 September 1983. After graduating from high school, he joined J1 League club Júbilo Iwata in 2002. However he could hardly play in the match behind Hideto Suzuki, Makoto Tanaka and so on. In 2005, Kaga was loaned to J2 League club Consadole Sapporo. He played as regular center back in 2 seasons. In 2007, he returned to Júbilo. He became a regular player as center back. Although his opportunity to play decreased from 2009, he became a regular player again in 2011. In 2012, he moved to FC Tokyo. Although he could not become a regular player, he played many matches as center back. In 2015, he moved to Urawa Reds. However he could hardly play in the match. In 2007, he moved to J2 club Montedio Yamagata.

Club statistics
.

Honours
 Blaublitz Akita
 J3 League (1): 2020

References

External links

Profile at Montedio Yamagata
Profile at Urawa
Profile at FC Tokyo
Profile at Iwata

1983 births
Living people
Association football people from Akita Prefecture
Japanese footballers
J1 League players
J2 League players
Júbilo Iwata players
Hokkaido Consadole Sapporo players
FC Tokyo players
Urawa Red Diamonds players
Montedio Yamagata players
Blaublitz Akita players
Association football defenders